The 2006 Belgian Figure Skating Championships took place between 25 and 26 November 2005 in Leuven. Skaters competed in the discipline of ladies' singles.

Senior results

Ladies

External links
 results

Belgian Figure Skating Championships
2005 in figure skating
Belgian Figure Skating Championships, 2006